Retreat is an upcoming American television limited series created by Brit Marling and Zal Batmanglij for FX.

Premise
The series follows Darby Hart, an amateur detective who tries to solve a murder that takes place at a retreat in a remote location when she and 11 other guests are invited by a billionaire to participate.

Cast and characters

Main
 Emma Corrin as Darby Hart
 Brit Marling as Lee
 Clive Owen as Andy
 Harris Dickinson as Bill
 Alice Braga as Sian
 Jermaine Fowler as Martin
 Joan Chen as Lu Mei
 Raúl Esparza as David
 Edoardo Ballerini as Ray
 Pegah Ferydoni as Ziba
 Ryan J. Haddad as Oliver
 Javed Khan as Rohan

Recurring
 Daniel Olson as Tomas
 Britian Seibert as Eva

Production

Development
On August 13, 2021, it was announced that FX had ordered the limited series, created and executive produced by Brit Marling and Zal Batmanglij who were also set to write and direct. The two had worked together for over a decade, including as the creators of the Netflix mystery-science fiction drama series The OA (2016–2019). Aside from Marling and Batmanglij, Andrea Sperling will also serve as an executive producer.

Casting
Along with the series' announcement, Marling was also set to co-star in a key role. On October 11, 2021, Emma Corrin was cast in the lead role of Darby Hart. On February 11, 2022, Clive Owen, Harris Dickinson, Alice Braga, Jermaine Fowler, Joan Chen, Raúl Esparza, Edoardo Ballerini, Pegah Ferydoni, Ryan J. Haddad, and Javed Khan were cast in main roles. On April 6, 2022, Daniel Olson and Britian Seibert were cast in recurring roles.

Filming
The series began principal photography on February 7, 2022, with filming taking place in New Zealand, Kearny, New Jersey, Utah, and Iceland. In April 2022, filming also took place for three days at the Readington River Buffalo Farm in Readington, New Jersey. On September 2, 2022, Marling posted on her Instagram account that it was the final day of shooting. In late December 2022, Los Angeles Times stated that the series had wrapped filming.

References

External links

 

2020s American television miniseries
American television miniseries
English-language television shows
FX Networks original programming
Murder in television
Upcoming drama television series